Lynn Conkwright (May 30, 1954 – June 14, 2017) was a professional female bodybuilder from the United States.

Biography
Lynn was born on May 30, 1954 in Norfolk, Virginia.  Conkwright trained for eight years in gymnastics, and won the Virginia State Gymnastics Championships.  She began weight training to improve her gymnastics.

Despite her small stature (5' tall and just over 100 pounds), she was one of the top professional competitors in the early 1980s. During her competitive career she became known for her incredible flexibility during her performances. Her greatest success was winning the 1981 Pro World Championship.  She also won the couples competition with Chris Dickerson in the same contest.  Lynn competed in the first six Ms. Olympia contests (the only other woman to do so was Carolyn Cheshire), twice finishing as high as third.

Lynn was selected by ABC to represent women's bodybuilding in the women's Superstars competition in 1982, where she finished tenth in a field of twelve competitors.  Conkwright placed first in rowing, third in basketball shooting, third in swimming, fifth in the bicycle race, fifth in golf, and seventh in the obstacle course.  After retiring in 1988, Lynn continued to be active in the fitness industry. In late 1988 and early 1989 at the age of 34 she became the first United States Sports Academy student to be certified as a bodybuilding coach after the United States Sports Academy began offering a Masters of Sport Science in Fitness Management. This suited Lynn very well since at one time she was the weight training coach for tennis superstar Martina Navratilova.

Later, Conkwright worked as the director of Weider Athlete Promotions and managed Weider contracted athletes.  She was inducted into the IFBB Hall of Fame in 2003.

Contest history
1980 NPC Miss Virginia Beach - 1st
1980 NPC USA Championship - 5th
1980 NPC Frank Zane Invitational - 3rd
1980 IFBB Ms. Olympia - 3rd
1981 IFBB Pro World Championships - 1st
1981 IFBB World Couples (with Chris Dickerson) - 1st
1981 IFBB Ms. Olympia - 3rd
1982 IFBB Ms. Olympia - 4th
1983 IFBB Ms. Olympia - 4th
1984 IFBB Ms. Olympia - 8th
1985 IFBB Ms. Olympia - 16th
1988 IFBB Pro World Championship - 14th

Magazine covers
1981 August Muscle & Fitness
1982 September Body & Power

References

Roark, Joe, "Factoids - Bodybuilder Lynn Conkwright", Flex, October, 2003
Reynolds, Bill. Hangin Loose With Muscleaneous: First Official Bodybuilding Coach. California: Flex Magazine(Volume 6). February 1989. . (Woodland Hills, CA: I, Brute Enterprises, Inc., 1988). Section: Departments: page 21 covers Lynn Conkwright's article.

External links
IFBB Hall of Fame profile
 1982 Women's Superstars competition
Factoids

1954 births
2017 deaths
American female bodybuilders
Professional bodybuilders
21st-century American women
Sportspeople from Norfolk, Virginia